Mediocredito Italiano S.p.A. (MCI) is an Italian commercial bank based in Milan, Lombardy region.

History
Istituto di credito per il finanziamento a medio termine alle piccole e medie industria della Lombardia or Mediocredito Lombardo in short was found in 1953, which Cassa di Risparmio delle Provincie Lombarde (Cariplo) was the major funder. In January 1992 the bank had changed from statutory corporation to limited company. As at 31 December 1996, Cariplo Group was the major shareholders of Mediocredito Lombardo (79.37%). The rest was owned by banks in Italy, such as Banca Apulia (0.013%).

Cariplo Group also owned 42.07% shares of Mediocredito Abruzzese e Molisano and 42.32% shares of Mediocredito del Sud, which was absorbed into Mediocredito Lombardo in 1997 and 1999 respectively. In 1998 Banca Intesa also became the ultimate parent company of Mediocredito Lombardo.

In 1999–2000 Mediocredito Lombardo acquired the controlling interests of Credito Industriale Sardo from the  (53.23%). In 2000, the bank was renamed to Banca Intesa Mediocredito, which became Banca IntesaBCI Mediocredito in 2001 to in line with the name change of the bank group. In 2003 the bank reverted to use Banca Intesa Mediocredito as legal name, or Intesa Mediocredito in short.

In 2007 the parent company merged with Sanpaolo IMI to form Intesa Sanpaolo Group. In 2008 the bank was renamed to Mediocredito Italiano.

In 2014, Leasint, Centro Leasing, leasing division of Neos Finance, Mediofactoring, Centro Factoring and Agriventure were merged into Mediocredito Italiano.

References

External links
  

Banks established in 1953
Italian companies established in 1953
Banks of Italy
Companies based in Milan
Cariplo acquisitions
Intesa Sanpaolo subsidiaries
Leasing companies